The 1945 Ohio State Buckeyes football team was an American football team that represented Ohio State University in the Big Ten Conference during the 1945 Big Ten Conference football season. In their second season under head coach Carroll Widdoes, the Buckeyes compiled a 7–2 record (5–2 against Big Ten opponents), finished in third place in the Big Ten, outscored opponents by a total of 194 to 71, and was ranked No. 12 in the final AP Poll. 

The Buckeyes ranked ninth nationally in rushing offense with an average of 237 yards per game. The ground attack was led by fullback Ollie Cline who ranked third in the nation with 931 rushing yards, an average of 5.44 yards per carry.

Three Ohio State players received first-team honors from the Associated Press (AP) or United Press (UP) on the 1945 All-Big Ten Conference football team: Ollie Cline at fullback (AP-1, UP-1); Russ Thomas at tackle (AP-1, UP-1); and Warren Amling at guard (AP-1, UP-1).

The 1944 Ohio State team had compiled an undefeated 9–0 record and won the Big Ten championship. Between the 1944 and 1945 seasons, the Buckeyes had a winning streak of 12 games that ended with a loss to Purdue on October 20, 1945.

Schedule

Game summaries

Pittsburgh
Statistics
Rushing: Oliver Cline 229 yards

Coaching staff
 Carroll Widdoes, head coach, second year
 Sam T. Selby, assistant

1946 NFL draftees

References

Ohio State
Ohio State Buckeyes football seasons
Ohio State Buckeyes football